Luis Induni (5 March 1920, in Romano di Lombardia, Bergamo, Lombardy, Italy – 31 December 1979, in Barcelona, Spain) was an Italian film actor of the 1950s 1960s and 1970s.

He made his debut in the western film Billy the Kid (1962) along with George Martin and Jack Taylor, and then he appeared in mostly Spaghetti Western Italian films starring as a sheriff, including Black Beauty in 1971, although his roles later in the 1970s extended to many other genres such as the 1972 horror film Dr. Jekyll y el Hombre Lobo. He also appeared in Cowards Don't Pray (1968), Dallas (1972), Damned Pistols of Dallas (1964), Woman for Ringo (1966), Mister Dynamit - Morgen küßt euch der Tod (1967), Il magnifico Texano (1967), and El hombre que mató a Billy el Niño (1967).

He appeared in the police drama film Duda (1951).

He died in 1979.

Selected filmography

References

Bibliography

External links 
 

Italian male film actors
1920 births
1979 deaths
Male Spaghetti Western actors
20th-century Italian male actors